Tell Me How may refer to

"Tell Me How", song by Buddy Holly from The "Chirping" Crickets
"Tell Me How", song by Chad Brock from III
"Tell Me How", song by Paramore from After Laughter